Mount Blades is a mountain 3 nautical miles (6 km) west-northwest of Bailey Ridge, on the north side of Boyd Glacier in the Ford Ranges, Marie Byrd Land. Discovered and mapped by the United States Antarctic Service (USAS) (1939–41). Named by Advisory Committee on Antarctic Names (US-ACAN) for Commander J.L. Blades, U.S. Navy, in charge of Antarctic support activities at McMurdo Station during the winter of 1965.

Mountains of Marie Byrd Land